SASI may refer to:

 Shugart Associates System Interface, the first embodiment of what is now known as SCSI
 SASI (software), a student information system developed by Pearson School Systems
 Shiprock Associated Schools, Inc.
 Socialist Workers' Sport International, in German Sozialistische Arbeiter Sport Internationale
 Sonoran Arthropod Studies Institute, a Tucson, Arizona educational nonprofit.
 South Australian Sports Institute, an elite athlete training program in South Australia
 Sutherland Astronomical Society (officially Sutherland Astronomical Society Incorporated), an amateur astronomical society based in Sydney, Australia.
 Swanson Analysis Systems, Inc., the name Ansys was founded under